Carlo Fumagalli (born April 25, 1996) is an Italian basketball player.

Career

Youth career
He start playing basketball with the Olimpia Milano's youth teams with whom he won the Italian league under-15 in 2011 and the Italian league under-17 in 2013.

Pro career
In seasons 2013–14 and 2014–15 he is part of the Olimpia Milano's roster, with whom he won the championship in 2014.
During the second season with Milano he is called up for the Euroleague matches against Anadolu Efes, Barcelona, Fenerbahçe and Maccabi Tel Aviv. He scores his first Serie A points against Virtus Bologna.
Since the summer of 2015 he is part of the Pallacanestro Mantovana's roster of the Serie A2.

Awards and accomplishments

Youth career
 Italian league Under-15 champion (2011)
 Italian league Under-17 champion (2013)

Pro career
 Italian league champion (2014)

Career statistics

Lega Basket Serie A

|-
| style="text-align:left;"| 2013–14
| style="text-align:left;"| Milano
| 2 || 0 || 1 || .0 || .0 || .0 || .0 || .0 || .5 || .0 || .0
|-
| style="text-align:left;"| 2014–15
| style="text-align:left;"| Milano
| 3 || 0 || 1.6 || .0 || .0 || 100 || .0 || .6 || .0 || .0 || 0.6
|- class="sortbottom"
| style="text-align:left;"| Career
| style="text-align:left;"|
| 5 || 0 || 1.4 || .0 || .0 || 100 || .0 || .4 || .2 || .0 || 0.4

External links
 Euroleague.net Profile
 Carlo Fumagalli at draftexpress.com
 Carlo Fumagalli at legabasket.it

1996 births
Italian men's basketball players
Living people
Point guards